Outer Manchuria, or Outer Northeast China, refers to a territory in Northeast Asia that is now part of Russia but used to belong to a series of dynasties based in China, including the Tang, Liao, Jin, Eastern Xia, Yuan, Northern Yuan, Ming, Later Jin, and Qing dynasties. The Russian Empire annexed this territory through a series of unequal treaties forced upon Qing China, most notably the Treaty of Aigun in 1858 and the Treaty of Peking in 1860. It is a part of the larger region of Manchuria, with the term "Outer Manchuria" only arising because of the Russian annexation.

Outer Manchuria comprises the modern-day Russian areas of Primorsky Krai, southern Khabarovsk Krai, the Jewish Autonomous Oblast, the Amur Oblast and the island of Sakhalin.

The northern part of the area was disputed by Qing China and the Russian Empire, in the midst of the Russia's Far East expansion, between 1643 and 1689. The Treaty of Nerchinsk signed in 1689 after a series of conflicts, defined the Sino–Russian border as the Stanovoy Mountains and the Argun River, affirming Qing China's sovereignty over the region now known as Outer Manchuria. However, after losing the Opium Wars, Qing China was forced to sign a series of treaties that gave away territories and ports to various Western powers as well as to Russia and Japan; these were collectively known as the Unequal Treaties. Starting with the Treaty of Aigun in 1858 and the Treaty of Peking in 1860, the Sino–Russian border was realigned in Russia's favour along the Amur and Ussuri rivers. As a result, China lost the region now known as Outer Manchuria (an area of more than 1 million km2) and access to the Sea of Japan.

History of the term
 

"Manchuria" was coined in the 19th century to refer to the northeastern part of the Qing empire, the traditional homeland of the Manchu people. The terms "Outer Manchuria" and "Inner Manchuria", modeled on Inner and Outer Mongolia, were coined after the loss of the "Outer" region by the Qing dynasty in 1860. After that event, "Manchuria" became an accepted term for "Inner" or "Chinese" Manchuria, being the area that remained within China. In the 1930s, the terms "Northern" and "Southern" Manchuria came into wider use, to refer to the northern and southern parts of Chinese Manchuria respectively.

Critics of the analogy with Inner and Outer Mongolia, however, suggest that while Mongols under the Qing dynasty were a recognized ethnic group, "Manchus" were a group constructed by the chieftain Nurhaci in the early 17th century, mainly for the purposes of conquering the Ming dynasty. According to this view, there were no Manchus north of the Nen River and the Songhua River, so that region cannot properly be called "Outer Manchuria". However, the native population of Outer Manchuria were southern Tungusics, closely related to the Manchu and no more different from them than the differences found among various Mongol groups. The only exception was the Nivkh people inhabiting the lowest reaches of the Amur River and the island of Sakhalin.

Place names
Today, there are reminders of the ancient Manchu domination in English-language toponyms: for example, the Sikhote-Alin, the great coastal range; the Khanka Lake; the Amur and Ussuri rivers; the Greater Khingan, Lesser Khingan and other small mountain ranges; and the Shantar Islands. Evenks, who speak a closely related Tungusic language, make up a significant part of the indigenous population.

History

The original inhabitants of the region were apparently the Mohe people and other Tungusic tribes. Other entities that once ruled parts of Outer Manchuria included Goguryeo and Balhae, whose territories extended from the northern Korean Peninsula to the southern and central parts of Inner and Outer Manchuria. According to the Treaty of Nerchinsk in 1689, the Chinese-Russian border was the Argun River and the Stanovoy Mountains until the Pacific coast. The eastern end of the boundary was generally held to be the Uda River, leaving Outer Manchuria to China. However, the Qing dynasty of China ceded Outer Manchuria to Russia in the Treaty of Aigun in 1858 and the Treaty of Peking in 1860, both of which are considered unequal treaties by China. A small region to the north of the Amur, known as the Sixty-Four Villages East of the (Heilongjiang) River, was kept by the Qing dynasty under the Treaty of Aigun, but was invaded and annexed by Russia in 1900. Outer Manchuria formed part of the far eastern provinces of the Soviet Union and was used as the launch-pad for the Soviet assault on Japanese-occupied Inner Manchuria in 1945. During the Chinese Civil War, Chinese communist forces began the war with large amounts of Inner Manchuria already in their hands; in 1949, the victorious communists established the present-day People's Republic of China.

In 2004, Russia agreed to transfer Yinlong Island and half of Heixiazi Island to China, ending a longstanding border dispute between Russia and China. Both islands are found at the confluence of the Amur and Ussuri rivers, and were until then administered by Russia and claimed by China. The transfer was meant to foster reconciliation and cooperation between the two countries, but it has also sparked different degrees of discontent on both sides. Russians, especially Cossack farmers in Khabarovsk who had plowlands on the islands, were unhappy about the loss of territory. The transfer has been ratified by both the Chinese National People's Congress and the Russian State Duma. The official transfer ceremony was held on-site on 14 October 2008.

Disputes

Outstanding boundary issues between China and Russia were officially settled in the 1991 Sino–Soviet Border Agreement. Article 6 of the 2001 Sino–Russian Treaty of Friendship provides that the contracting parties—the People's Republic of China and the Russian Federation—have no territorial claims.

As the Republic of China, now based in Taiwan, has never recognized the People's Republic of China nor its border treaties with other countries, some maps published in Taiwan still show the entire Heixiazi Island and the Sixty-Four Villages East of the River as Chinese territories. However, these maps show Outer Manchuria, sometimes called "lost territories in the Northeast", to be Russian territory.

Some Manchu and Han Chinese regard Outer Manchuria as territory that was unfairly taken away, as in Mao's comments leading up to the Sino–Soviet border conflict.

See also
 1991 Sino–Russian Border Agreement
 Hulun
 Inner Manchuria
 Outer Mongolia
 Tannu Uriankhai
 Far Eastern Republic
 Green Ukraine
 Outer Northwest China
 Sixty-Four Villages East of the River
 Blagoveshchensk massacre and Sixty-Four Villages East of the River massacre
 Amur Annexation

Notes

References

External links
 Books.google.com:  Russia in Manchuria — 1903 illustrated article.

East Asia
Inner Asia
Geography of Northeast Asia
Geography of the Russian Far East
Historical regions of China
History of Manchuria
China–Russia border
China–Russian Empire relations
China–Russia relations